The 2013–14 Espérance Sportive de Tunis season was the 95th season in existence and the club's 59th consecutive season in the top flight of Tunisian football. In addition to the domestic league, Espérance de Tunis are participated in the Tunisian Cup and the CAF Champions League for 2013 and 2014 editions.

Squad list
Note: Flags indicate national team as has been defined under FIFA eligibility rules. Players may hold more than one non-FIFA nationality.

Competitions

Overview

{| class="wikitable" style="text-align: center"
|-
!rowspan=2|Competition
!colspan=8|Record
!rowspan=2|Starting round
!rowspan=2|Final position / round
!rowspan=2|First match
!rowspan=2|Last match
|-
!
!
!
!
!
!
!
!
|-
| Ligue 1

| 
| style="background:gold;"| Winners
| 26 September 2013
| 11 May 2014
|-
| Tunisian Cup

| Round of 32 
| Quarter-finals
| 20 April 2014
| 15 June 2014
|-
| Champions League 2013

| Group stage
| Semi-finals
| 21 July 2013
| 19 October 2013
|-
| Champions League 2014

| First round
| Group stage
| 1 March 2014
| 8 June 2014
|-
! Total

|bgcolor=silver colspan=2|
! 21 July 2013
! 15 June 2014

Ligue 1

League table

Results by round

Matches

Results summary

Tunisian Cup

2013 CAF Champions League

Group stage

Group B

Knock-out stage

Semi-finals

2014 CAF Champions League

Qualifying rounds

First round

Second round

Group stage

Group B

Notes

References

External links

2013-14

Tunisian football club seasons